Lee Joon-ik (born September 21, 1959) is a South Korean film director and producer. He is best known for directing and producing King and the Clown (2005), one of the highest grossing Korean films of all time. Other notable films include Sunny (2008), Hope (2013), The Throne (2015), Dongju: The Portrait of a Poet (2016), and The Book of Fish (2021).

Filmography

Awards and nominations

References

External links

1959 births
Living people
South Korean film directors
South Korean film producers
South Korean male film actors
Grand Prize Paeksang Arts Award (Film) winners